The 2021 European Mixed Team Judo Championships will be held in Ufa, Bashkortostan, Russia on 27 November 2021. The competition will be the 3rd edition of the European Mixed Team Judo Championships, following the Yekaterinburg 2018 and Minsk 2019 editions.

Event videos
The event will air freely on the EJU YouTube channel.

Results

Main draw

Repechage

References

External links
 
 Results book

European Mixed Team Judo Championships
European Judo Championships
European Mixed
EU 2021
November 2021 sports events in Russia
Sport in Ufa
Judo competitions in Russia
International sports competitions hosted by Russia